Malacomorpha is a genus of striped walkingsticks in the family Pseudophasmatidae. There are about 15 described species in the genus Malacomorpha.

Species
The following species are recognised in the genus Malacomorpha:

 Malacomorpha androsensis Rehn & J.A.G., 1906
 Malacomorpha bastardoae Conle, Hennemann & Perez-Gelabert, 2008
 Malacomorpha cancellata (Redtenbacher, 1906)
 Malacomorpha cyllarus (Westwood, 1859)
 Malacomorpha guamuhayaense Zompro & Fritzsche, 2008
 Malacomorpha hispaniola Conle, Hennemann & Perez-Gelabert, 2008
 Malacomorpha jamaicana (Redtenbacher, 1906)
 Malacomorpha longipennis (Redtenbacher, 1906)
 Malacomorpha macaya Conle, Hennemann & Perez-Gelabert, 2008
 Malacomorpha minima Conle, Hennemann & Perez-Gelabert, 2008
 Malacomorpha multipunctata Conle, Hennemann & Perez-Gelabert, 2008
 Malacomorpha obscura Conle, Hennemann & Perez-Gelabert, 2008
 Malacomorpha poeyi (Saussure, 1868)
 Malacomorpha sanchezi Conle, Hennemann & Perez-Gelabert, 2008
 Malacomorpha spinicollis (Burmeister, 1838)

References

Further reading

 

Phasmatodea genera